Balkancar is a Bulgarian company for research and manufacturing of electrical vehicles for the production industry. The first electrical driven forklift in Bulgaria was produced in 1951 in the tram and trolleybus factory "September 6" in Sofia. The production of forklifts in Bulgaria is one of the sectors of the mechanical engineering which in its history contains many significant world achievements. With the development of the first experimental series of lifting and transport machines in Bulgaria in 1952, the production grew and improved, while at the end of the 70s of the last century, Bulgaria came out on top in terms of volume of production of forklifts in the world.

The structure of the Balkancar association in the 1980s included not only the main assembly factories. It also includes enterprises for the production of intermediate products used in the creation of electric and forklift trucks. At the end of the 80's it had 39 divisions - 31 in the country and 8 abroad. Its factories also produce buses, cars, bicycles and more.

In Bulgaria, the traditions in the production and supply of high quality and affordable lifting and transport equipment under the brand "Balkancar" continue to be maintained, but on a much smaller scale than in the past. Different types of industrial vehicles are produced: electric trucks, forklifts, platform trucks, tugs, and hoists.

References

External links 
 

Forklift truck manufacturers
Companies established in 1951
1951 establishments in Bulgaria
Manufacturing companies of Bulgaria